Al-Fassi or Al-Fasi is a surname. Notable people with the name include:

Imam Fassi ( 1760 CE – c. 1863 CE), Moroccan imam
al-Fassi family, constituting the Fassiyatush Shadhiliyya Sufi order
Isaac Alfasi (1013–1103), Moroccan Talmudist, posek and rabbi
Abbas El Fassi (born 1940), Moroccan politician
Abd al-Rahman al-Fasi (1631–1685), Moroccan writer
Abd al-Qadir al-Fasi (1599–1680), Moroccan writer
Abu Imran al-Fasi (974–1015), Moroccan writer
Abu l-Mahasin Yusuf al-Fasi ( 1530 – 1604), Moroccan theologian 
Ahmad ibn Idris al-Fasi (1760–1837), Moroccan theologian
Ahmad Zarruq al-Barnusi al-Fasi (1442–1493), Moroccan scholar and writer
Allal al-Fassi (1910–1974), Moroccan politician, writer, poet and Islamic scholar
David ben Abraham al-Fasi (died before 1026 CE), lexicographer
 Al-Hassan al-Wazzan al-Fasi or Leo Africanus ( 1494 – c. 1554), Moroccan geographer
Asia Alfasi (born 1984), Libyan-British comic writer and artist
Eric Alfasi (born 1970), Israeli basketball player and coach
Hatoon al-Fassi (born 1964), Saudi Arabian historian
Hamdun ibn al-Hajj al-Fasi (1760–1817), Moroccan scholar
Malika al-Fassi (1908–1991), Moroccan writer and nationalist
Mohammed al-Mahdi al-Fasi, Moroccan biographer and historian
Mohammed ibn Hajj al-Abdari al-Fasi ( 1258 – 1336), Moroccan writer
Mohammed ibn Kiran al-Fasi (1758–1812), Moroccan, religious scholar and politician
Mohammed ibn Zakri al-Fasi (died 1731), Moroccan writer
Taqi al-Din Muhammad ibn Ahmad al-Fasi (1373–1429), Saudi Arabian scholar and judge

Fasi